Lvovsky is a microdistrict of the city of Podolsk and formerly an urban locality (an urban-type settlement) in Podolsky District, Moscow Oblast, Russia. Population:

References

Urban-type settlements in Moscow Oblast